Nick Jennings may refer to:

 Nick Jennings (computer scientist) (born 1966), British computer scientist
 Nick Jennings (artist), American animation director